Anyte of Tegea was a Hellenistic poet from Tegea in Arcadia.  Little is known of her life, but twenty-four epigrams attributed to her are preserved in the Greek Anthology, and one is quoted by Julius Pollux; nineteen of these are generally accepted as authentic.  She introduced rural themes to the genre, which became a standard theme in Hellenistic epigrams.   She is one of the nine outstanding ancient women poets listed by Antipater of Thessalonica in the Palatine Anthology.  Her pastoral poetry may have influenced Theocritus, and her works were adapted by several later poets, including Ovid.

Life 
No reliable information about Anyte's life survives, and she can only be approximately dated by the style of her work.  Based on this, and on possible imitations of her works in the second half of the third century BC, she is generally thought to have been active around 300 BC.  According to Julius Pollux, writing in the second century AD, she was from Tegea in Arcadia.  An alternative tradition, recorded in the Greek Anthology, claimed that Anyte was from Mytilene on Lesbos. Anyte's use of a Doric dialect, and mentions in her poem of Tegea and the Arcadian god Pan, suggest that a Tegean origin is more likely, though Pollux may have simply assumed this on the basis of Anyte's mention of Tegea. The story of a Lesbian origin was likely a later invention to link Anyte to Sappho.  

Only one story about Anyte's life is preserved.  Pausanias claims that she was once visited by the god Asclepius while she was asleep, and told to go to Naupactus to visit a certain blind man there.  On doing so, the man was cured, and he built a temple to Asclepius.  Though little is known about Anyte's life, more of her poetry survives than any other ancient Greek woman, with the exception of Sappho.

Poetry 
Twenty-five epigrams attributed to Anyte in antiquity survive, one quoted by Julius Pollux and the remainder in the Palatine or Planudean Anthology.  Of these, nineteen are generally agreed to be by Anyte.  Of the remaining six, four are attributed to both Anyte and another author in either the Palatine or Planudean Anthology,  and two epigrams are attributed to Anyte by the Palatine Anthology, but are included without an author named in the Planudean.  Of these six uncertain poems, two (AP 7.190 and 7.232) are considered possibly or probably by Anyte; the others are generally doubted.  It is likely that Anyte compiled a book of her poetry from her epigrams – she may have been the first to do so.  The Greek Anthology twice refers to her as "the lyric poet", and Pausanias mentions her epic poetry, but neither lyric nor epic poetry by Anyte survive.

Anyte's poetry is composed in a mixed dialect, with elements of Doric and epic language, as well as some Atticisms; it was common for Hellenistic poets to deliberately mix dialects in this way.  It is often interested in women and children, and Kathryn Gutzwiller argues that it was deliberately composed in opposition to traditional epigrams, which were by anonymous authors and from a masculine and urban perspective.  Accordingly, of five epitaphs written by Anyte which survive, only one marks the death of a young man, as was traditional in the genre; the remaining four all commemorate women who died young.  She is most famous for her epitaphs for animals and pastoral epigrams describing idyllic landscapes.  Two dedicatory epigrams by Anyte also survive.

Anyte's poetry was, like that of her contemporaries, highly allusive, particularly referencing Homer. She imitates the structure and syntax of Homer's poetry, making use of Homeric vocabulary to write about personal and domestic themes.  For instance, Anyte's epigram 6, an epitaph dedicated to the unmarried Antibia, repeatedly echoes phrases from the Iliad and Odyssey.  She also echoes Homer in her frequent use of compound adjectives, such as her description of the poikilodeiros ("with a neck of many colours") snake in epigram 10. Her work references Hesiod, archaic Greek lyric and Attic drama, and shows evidence that she was familiar with the epigrams of Simonides of Ceos and Anacreon.

Reception
Anyte's pastoral poems and epitaphs for pets were important innovations, with both genres becoming standards in Hellenistic poetry.  Her pastoral works may have influenced Theocritus, and both Ovid and Marcus Argentarius wrote adaptations of her poems; the epigrammatist Mnasalces produced an epigram collection in imitation of Anyte.  Antipater of Thessalonica lists her in his canon of nine women poets.  According to Tatian, statues of Anyte were sculpted by Cephisodotus and Euthycrates.

At the beginning of the twentieth century, Anyte's poetry was highly thought of by the Imagist poets, with Richard Aldington describing her in his translation of Greek and Latin poetry as the "woman-Homer".  Modern scholars have been more critical of Anyte's work, considering her subjects frivolous.  However, Josephine Balmer describes her poetry as "stunning", and argues that it demonstrates both education and technical skill.  Anyte is one of the women included on Judy Chicago's Heritage Floor, and has a crater on Mercury named after her.

Notes

References

Works cited

Further reading

External links 
 
 Anyte: translation of all surviving epigrams at attalus.org; adapted from W. R. Paton (1916–18)
 Epigrams by Women from the Greek Anthology at Diotíma, translated with notes by Marilyn B. Skinner.  Includes Anyte 15 (AP 9.144).
 Bibliography for Anyte at A Hellenistic Bibliography, compiled and maintained by Martine Cuypers, Trinity College Dublin.

3rd-century BC Greek people
3rd-century BC Greek women
3rd-century BC poets
3rd-century BC women writers
Ancient Arcadian poets
Ancient Greek women poets
Doric Greek poets
Epigrammatists of the Greek Anthology
Tegea
Ancient Tegeans